John Sutro (23 April 1903 – 18 June 1985) was a British film producer. He produced seven films between 1941 and 1951. He was a member of the jury at the 7th Berlin International Film Festival.

Education
At Oxford Sutro conceived the Railway Club, which was dominated by Harold Acton. The other members included: Henry Yorke, Roy Harrod, Henry Thynne, 6th Marquess of Bath, David Plunket Greene, Edward Henry Charles James Fox-Strangways, 7th Earl of Ilchester, Brian Howard, Michael Parsons, 6th Earl of Rosse, Hugh Lygon, Bryan Guinness, 2nd Baron Moyne, Patrick Balfour, 3rd Baron Kinross, Mark Ogilvie-Grant, John Drury-Lowe and Evelyn Waugh.

Personal life
He was a close friend of the Mitford sisters and was a regular part of the group of artists and intellectuals with whom they regularly associated in the 1920s and 1930s. Sutro was Jewish.

Filmography
 49th Parallel (1941)
 The Way Ahead (1944)
 Men of Two Worlds (1946)
 Carnival (1946)
 Children of Chance (1949)
 Her Favourite Husband (1950)
 Honeymoon Deferred (1951)
 Cheer the Brave (1951)

References

External links

1903 births
1985 deaths
British film producers
British Jews
Businesspeople from London
20th-century English businesspeople